Three ships of the United States Navy have borne the name USS Foote, named in honor of Rear Admiral Andrew Hull Foote.

, was the lead ship of  launched in 1896 and sold in 1920
In 1944 she was transferred to the Soviet Union and recommissioned  as Zhostkyi. She was returned to Great Britain in 1949 and scrapped in 1952

United States Navy ship names